The Sediari pontifici were chair-bearers of the pope on the sedia gestatoria. Originally servants of the papal household, they later became a lay confraternity. The origins of the chair-bearers lie in medieval times, earlier even than the Swiss Guards.

Palafrenieri
The earlier red-dressed papal grooms or palafrenieri were a different group of papal servants, originally liverymen for the papal carriage, then an influential confraternity, then finally merged with the sediari. The sediari and parafrenieri constituted a confraternity from 1378, later the Arciconfraternita di Sant'Anna de Parafrenieri (Archconfraternity of Saint Anne of the Papal Grooms). Pius IV allowed them in 1565 to erect the chiesa di Sant'Anna dei Palafrenieri, designed by Jacopo Barozzi da Vignola.

John Paul II

Pope John Paul II disbanded the chair-bearers in 1978. However papal ushers  (Italian Gentiluomo di sua santità) carried him on his death in 2005.

References

Papal chamberlains
Holy See awards
Court titles
Italian words and phrases